Death of a Harbour Master (other English-language titles are Death of a Harbormaster, Maigret and the Death of a Harbor Master and The Misty Harbor) is a detective novel by Belgian writer Georges Simenon, featuring his character inspector Jules Maigret.

Other titles
The book has been published five times in English: in 1941 as Death of a Harbour Master, in 1942 as Death of a Harbor Master, in 1943 as Death of a Harbormaster, in 1989 as Maigret and the Death of a Harbor Master translated by Stuart Gilbert; in 2015 as The Misty Harbor translated by Linda Coverdale.

Adaptations
The novel has been adapted three times for film and television: in English, in 1961 as The Lost Sailor, with Rupert Davies in the main role; in French, in 1996 as Maigret et le port des brumes, with Bruno Cremer in the main role, and in 1972 as Le Port des brumes with Jean Richard in the lead role;

External links

Maigret at trussel.com

References

1932 Belgian novels
Maigret novels
Novels set in France
Novels set in the 20th century